Ronald Alexander may refer to:

Ronald Alexander (playwright) (1917–1995), American playwright
Ronald Alexander (badminton) (born 1993), Indonesian badminton player
Ronald Okeden Alexander (1888–1949), military officer in the Canadian army